The 1897 Rhode Island Rams football team represented the University of Rhode Island in the 1897 college football season. It was the third season in school history. Rhode Island finished the season with a record of 1–2. Their second game against Connecticut was the first game in the Rhode Island–UConn football rivalry.

Schedule

References

Rhode Island
Rhode Island Rams football seasons
Rhode Island Rams football